

England

Head coach: Dick Greenwood

 Steve Bainbridge
 Steve Boyle
 John Carleton
 Maurice Colclough
 Les Cusworth
 Huw Davies
 Paul Dodge
 Dusty Hare
 Bob Hesford
 John Horton
 Nick Jeavons
 Steve Mills
 Gary Pearce
 John Scott (c.)**
 Colin Smart
 Steve Smith (c.)*
 Tony Swift
 David Trick
 Peter Wheeler
 Peter Winterbottom
 Nick Youngs

France

Head coach: Jacques Fouroux

 Christian Belascain
 Pierre Berbizier
 Serge Blanco
 Didier Camberabero
 Didier Codorniou
 Jean Condom
 Christian Delage
 Philippe Dintrans
 Pierre Dospital
 Jean-Louis Dupont
 Dominique Erbani
 Patrick Estève
 Bernard Herrero
 Jean-François Imbernon
 Jean-Luc Joinel
 Gerard Martinez
 Jean-Charles Orso
 Robert Paparemborde
 Jean-Pierre Rives (c.)
 Laurent Rodriguez
 Philippe Sella
 Bernard Vivies

Ireland

Head coach: Willie John McBride

 Ollie Campbell
 Willie Duggan
 Moss Finn
 Ciaran Fitzgerald (c.)
 David Irwin
 Moss Keane
 Michael Kiernan
 Donal Lenihan
 Hugo MacNeill
 Robbie McGrath
 Ginger McLoughlin
 John O'Driscoll
 Phil Orr
 Trevor Ringland
 Fergus Slattery

 Ireland used the same 15 players during all the tournament

Scotland

Head coach: Jim Telfer

 Jim Aitken (c.)*
 Roger Baird
 John Beattie
 Jim Calder
 Bill Cuthbertson
 Colin Deans
 Peter Dods
 Brian Gossman
 David Johnston
 Roy Laidlaw (c.)**
 David Leslie
 Gerry McGuinness
 Iain Milne
 Iain Paxton
 Jim Pollock
 Jim Renwick
 Keith Robertson
 Tom Smith
 Alan Tomes

Wales

Head coach: John Bevan

 Rob Ackerman
 Eddie Butler (c.)
 Malcolm Dacey
 Richard Donovan
 Ian Eidman
 Gwyn Evans
 Terry Holmes
 Billy James
 Staff Jones
 Richard Moriarty
 Bob Norster
 John Perkins
 Dai Pickering
 Graham Price
 Clive Rees
 Elgan Rees
 David Richards
 Mark Ring
 Jeff Squire
 Clive Williams
 Mark Wyatt

External links
1983 Five Nations Championship Statistics

Six Nations Championship squads